The Farnsworth House is a Ludwig Mies van der Rohe-designed house in Plano, Illinois, US. 

Farnsworth House also may refer to:

United States
 Samuel Farnsworth House, West Hartford, Connecticut, listed on the National Register of Historic Places
 Farnsworth House (North Bridgton, Maine), listed on the National Register of Historic Places
 Julia Farnsworth House, Beaver, Utah, listed on the National Register of Historic Places

See also
 Farnsworth Homestead, Rockland, Maine, listed on the National Register of Historic Places
 Julia P. M. Farnsworth Barn, Beaver, Utah, listed on the National Register of Historic Places
 Farnsworth Apartments, Ogden, Utah, listed on the National Register of Historic Places
 Farnsworth Art Museum